This is a list of existing Roman sites in Spain.

Altars
Roman altar of Arcos de la Frontera

Archaeological sites 

 Archaeological Ensemble of Acinipo
 Almoina Archaeological Centre
 Cabeza Ladrero
 Roman ruins of Calduba
 Archaeological site of Can Modolell
 Archaeological Park of Carranque
 Archaeological site of Cercadilla
 Archaeological site of Cimadevilla
 Archaeological site of l'Esquerda
 Archaeological site of San Roque
 Archaeological site of Santa Eulalia
 Archaeological site of Saucedo (Caesarobriga)
 Archaeological Park of Segóbriga
 Casa de Orfeo
 Casa romana de la calle Añón de Zaragoza
 Castro Bergidum
 Iturissa
 Llíberis
 Merida
 Pol·lèntia

Amphitheatres 
 Astorga Amphitheatre - Asturica Augusta 
 Amphitheatre of Empuries  
 Espejo Amphitheatre - Ucubi  
 Amphitheatre of Carthago Nova  
 Ciavieja Amphitheatre 
 Amphitheatre of Astigi (Écija)  
 Amphitheatre of Carmona  
  
 Caparra Amphitheatre - Capera   
 Coruna del Conde Amphitheatre - Clunia  
 Ercavica Amphitheatre - Ercavica 
 Mesa de Gandul Amphitheatre 
 Amphiteatre of Emerita Augusta
 Santiponce Amphitheatre - Italica 
 Amphiteatre of Legio ( Leon)
 Nertobriga Amphitheatre - Nertobriga  
 Amphitheatre of Segobriga
 Sisapo Amphitheatre - Sisapo  
 Amphitheatre of Tarraco
 Amphitheatre of Toletum
 Valeria de Arriba Amphitheatre - Valeria

Theatres 
 Theatre of Acinipo
 Arcobriga Theatre - Arcobriga 
 Theatre of Baelo Claudia
 Theatre of Badalona  
 Theatre of Bilbilis
 Roman theatre of Zaragoza
 Roman theatre of Cartagena
 Theatre of Clunia Sulpicia
 Roman theatre of Córdoba
  Casas de Reina Theater
 Huesca Theatre - Osca 
 Theatre of Mérida  
 Roman theatre of Cádiz
 Theatre of Itálica
 Roman theatre of Málaga
 Palma de Majorca Theatre
 Roman theatre of Medellín 
  Osuna Theatre - Osuna 
 Ronda la Vieja Theatre - Acinipo
 Sagunto Roman theatre
 Theatre of Segobriga
 Singilia Barba Singilia Theatre 
 Tiermes Theatre, Termes  
 Theatre of Tarragona
 Almunecar Theatre - Sexi
 Valeria de Arriba Theatre - Valeria

Aqueducts 
 Almuñécar (5 above ground aqueducts - 4 still in use)
 Acueducto romano de Albarracín-Cella Albarracín-Cella
 Barcino
 Canal de los Franceses  
 Cónchar Acueducto  
 Acueducto Bejís 
 Acueducto romano de Quicena 
 Aqueduct of Albatana
 Roman aqueduct of Sexi, Almuñécar
 Roman aqueduct of Cádiz
 Acueduct Tempul-Cadiz 
 Acueducto Aqua Fontis Aureae (Córdoba) Aqua Fontis Aureae 
 Acueducto Aqua Nova Domitiana Augusta (Córdoba) Aqua Nova Domitiana Augusta 
 BODEGA ROMANA DE FUNES en el Valle del Paraiso  
  Consuegra Aqueduct
 Acueducto Itálica   
 Calicasa Aqueduct 
 Les Ferreres
 Acueducto de Lodosa 
 Los Milagros
 Los Bañales acueducto 
 Lugo
 Acueducto en Obeilar 
 Acueducto ef Plasencia 
 Acueducto of Neria 
 Puente de los Moros 
 Huelva/Onuba Aestuaria
 Merida (Rabo de Buey-San Lázaro)
 Roman Aqueduct Almunecar      
 Segovia 
 Soneixa Aqueduct  
 Puente - Acueducto romano de Quicena  
 Acueducto de la Peña Cortada 
 Seville/Caños de Carmona
 Termancia (Tiermes)
 Toletum
 Acueducto de Valdepuentes (Córdoba) Valdepuentes

Triumphal arches 
 Arc de Berà
Arch of Cabanes 
Arch of Medinaceli
 Arch of Trajan ( Merida)

Arches 
 Arch of Cáparra
 Arch of Cabanes  
 Arco del Cristo
 Arco de los Blanco

Bridges 
 Alcántara Bridge
 Albarregas Roman bridge
 Bridge of Alegria  
 Bridge of Los Cobos
 Casa del Molino de Carrillo  
 Puente Río Arnoia  
 Puente Bibei (OURENSE)  
 Puente de Alcántara, Toledo
 Puente de Alconetar 
 Puente de Atiguieta 
 Puente del Genoves 
 Puente del Castellar (Cuenca) 
 Puente del Diablo 
 Puente sobre el Arzua 
 Ponte Bibei, Mendoya 
 Puente de la Malena 
 Puente de Masegoso
 Puente de Reparacea 
 Puente Masegoso  
 Puente Mocho 
 Puente La Mallona 
 Puente Mocho 
 Ponte Navea 
 uente sobre rio Jóbalo 
 Puente Valimbre 
 Puente el río Zadorra en Víllodas  
 Puente de Trespuentes 
 Puente Romano Nestar 
 Puente Vella de Vilariño Frío 
 Puente Romano Ablanque  
 Puente Romano Luco de Jiloca 
 Puente Mantible  
 Puente Romano de Calamocha  
 Puente del Andaluz, San Marcial  
 Puente de Andújar  
 Puente de Medellin  
 Puente de Cabezón de Pisuerga 
 Puente sul rio Pisuerga 
 Puente da Cigarrosa, Petín 
 Puente Romano, Burguete - Auritz 
 Puente Romano de Caparra 
 Puente Romano  
 Puente Romano y ermita de la virgen  
 Puente Romano Layos  
 Puento Romano, Niebla (Río Tinto)  
 Puente Romano, San Clemente  
 Puente Romano de Villa del Río  
 Puente Romano Sobre Rio Segre  
 Puente Romano sobre el Grito  
 Puente Romano en el Camino de Toledo  
 Puente sobre el Río Huerva  
 Puente de la Malena   
 Punte del Canto  
 Puente del Roque  
 Puente de Camparañon   
 Puente Reparazea-Oieregi  
 Puente Venta de Magasca  
 Puente de Alcantarilla  
 Puente de la Vizana  
 Puente de la Cumbre 
 Puente romano de la Magdalena 
 Puente Romano Luco de Jiloca   
 Puente Romano en Nestar  
 Puente Romano de Potato  
 Puente Romano Nestar  
 Puente Romano de Mantible  
 Puente Romano de Socuéllamo 
 Puente de Valdesalor 
 Puente Romano, El Pardiel, Cervera del Río Alhama 
 Puente de las Alberguesias 
 Puente Romano Sasamón 
 Puente Romano de Trisla  
 Puente Romano de Allariz  
 Puente romano del Burgo de Osma  
 Puente Romano Cerca de Villa nueva de los infantes  
 Puente de San Pedro  
 Puente de Segura  
 Puente Romano Sobre el Río Cigüela de Villarta de San Juan Puente sobre el rio Bañuelos
 Puente sobre el Rio Bañuelos   
 Puente sobre el Río Arandilla 
 Puente Romano Romangordo/Tajo 
 Ponte románica sobre o Louro 
 Puente Romano de Calamocha  
 Puente Romano . Talamanca de Jarama  
 Puente Romano de Alardos   
 Puente Romano de Carmona  
 Puente Romano de Villarta de San Juan 
 Puente Romano Valdemaqueda  
 Puente Romano Becilla de Valderaduey  
 Tordómar Puente de Tordómar
 Puente Tobera  
 Alconétar Bridge
 Pons Neviae   
 Bridge of Andújar
 Roman bridge of Ávila
 Puente sobre río Duero  
 Puente da Cigarrosa  
 Puente de Miluce sobre el río Arga 
 Pont romain, Ciraqui (Navarra)  
 Puente de San Pedro 
 Puente la Reina 
 Puente y ermita de Villahermosa del Campo 
 Puente Romano y río Pancrudo, Luco de Jiloca 
 Puente Romano de El Viso 
 Bridge of Bermaña
 Bridge of Caesar Augusta (located on the site of bridge Puente de piedra (Zaragoza) and it was a mixed work of stone and wood).
 Puente Miluze  
 Puente de las Herrerías  
 Puente de San Pedro 
 Guadiana Roman bridge
 Puente de Astiguieta   
 Puente Romano sobre el Río Valiñas  
 Puente Romano en Sogo Zamora  
 Puente Romano de Trespuentes  
 Frías (Burgos) Roman Bridge of Frias 
 Roman bridge of Córdoba
 Roman bridge del Descalzo
 Puente Romano (Mérida)
 Puente Viejo  
 Roman bridge of Moldera
 Roman bridge of Lugo
 Roman bridge of Ourense
 Roman bridge of Talamanca de Jarama
 Roman bridge of Salamanca
 Bridge of Segura
 Puente Romano de Trespuentes  
 Bridge of Valimbre  
 Pont del Diable
 Puentecillas (Palencia)

Circus 
 Calahorra Circus - Calagurris  
 Consuegra
 Cordoba Circus
 Ecija Circus - Astigi
 Circus Maximus of Emerita Augusta
 Circus of Tarraco  
 Circus of Toletum 
 Sagunto Circus - Saguntum
 Santiponce Circus - Italica 
 Segobriga Circus 
 Valencia Circus - Valentia

Dams 
 Alcantarilla Dam
 Almonacid de la Cuba Dam
 Consuegra Dam
 Cornalvo Dam
 Ermita de la Virgen del Pilar Dam
 Esparragalejo Dam
 Iturranduz Dam
 Jumilla Dam 
 La Pared de los Moros
 Muel Dam
 Murro Dam 
 Proserpina Dam
 Puy Foradado Dam 
 Rambla de Julbena Dam 
 Villafranca del Campo Dam

Forums 
 Augusteum and Forum of Cartagena
 Forum of Astorga
 Forum of Zaragoza
 Forum of Cáparra
 Forum of Saguntum
 Forum of Clunia Sulpicia
 Colonial forum of Tarragona
 Provincial forum of Tarragona
 Forum adiectum of Córdoba
 Colonial forum of Córdoba
 Provincial forum of Mérida (only remain the main gate)
 Municipal forum of Mérida

Mausoleums 
 Mausoleum of Abla  
 Yacimiento El Vizcaíno y mausoleo de Layos  
 Mausoleo romano de la Sinagoga en Sádaba (Zaragoza) Mausoleo_de_los_Atilios
 Mausoleum of Centcelles 
 Mausoleum of Chiprana
 Mausoleo de los Atilios  
 Mausoleo romano de "La Torrecilla" 
 Roman mausoleum of Córdoba
 Mausoleum of Fabara
 Mausoleum of Las Vegas
 Mausoleum of Miralpeix
 Mausoleum of Punta del Moral

Palaces 
 Palace of Maximian

Public baths and thermals 
 Caviclum (Termas) 
 Roman baths and snow pit of the Street Reyes Huertas (Mérida)
 Baths of Acinipo
 Baths of Alange
 Roman Baths of Aquae Calidae 
 Roman Baths of Arcala  
 Baths of Astorga
 Roman baths of Badalona
 Roman baths of Baños de Montemayor
 Roman baths of Zaragoza
 Baths of Cáparra
 Baths of Cartagena
 Roman baths of Campo Valdés
 Baths of Clunia Sulpicia
 Roman baths of Alcalá de Henares
 Baths of Lecrín
 Roman baths of León
 Roman baths of Lugo 
 Roman baths of Nimfeo (Fortuna)  
 Roman Baths of San Lázaro
 Roman baths of Toledo
 Major baths of Itálica
 Molacillos-Termas Romana  
 Minor baths of Itálica
 El Conventón, Rebolledo, Valdeola 
 Segobriga termes
 Thermal complex of Herrera
 Thermal baths of Termantia
 Termas romanas de El Castrejón

Temples 
 Pórtico de Curia Pórtico de Curia
 Temple of Augustus (Barcino)
 Los Mármoles Temple 
 Yacimiento arqueológico de La Escuera 
 Santa Eulalia de Bóveda Lucus Augusti
 Temple of Alcántara
 Temple of Corduba
 Temple of Diana (Emerita Augusta)
 Temple of Diana (Augustobirga) 
 Santuario de Munigua  
 Temple of Melqart (Gades)
 Miralpeix, Caspe 
 Temple of Trajan (Italica)
 Temple of Vic
 Torre del Breny  
 Vilablareix Temple

Towers 
 Tower of Hercules
 Torre dels Escipions
 Torre Ciega
 Tower of Hercules, Villajoyosa
 Torre Soto de Roma  
 Cuarto Roble 
 El Junquillo

Walls 
 Walls of Astroga
 Walls of Asturica Augusta
 Roman walls of Zaragoza
 Roman walls of Barcelona
 Walls of Empúries
 Walls of Seville
 Walls of León
 Roman Walls of Lugo
 Walls of Tarragona
 Roman walls of Cimadevilla
 Walls of Entretorres
 Roman and Moorish City walls of Arcos de la Frontera

Quarry and mines 
 Channel of La Cabrera
 Cantera Romana en L'Énova  
 Las Médulas
 Quarry of Carthago Nova
 Quarry of El Mèdol

Christian buildings 
 Early Christian Cemetery of Tarragona
 Church of Santa Engracia de Zaragoza
 Mina La Jayona  
 Palaeochristian basilica at Empúries
 Sant Romà de Sidillà

Other architecture 
 Roman water duct Almonacid de la Cuba  
 Roman Watermill  
 Barracks of Legio
 La Cueva, Camesa y Rebolledo, Valdeolea Building  
 Ciavieja
 Cisterna de Andelos  
 Monument of Urkulu  
 Decumanus maximus of Carthago Nova
  Baños de la Reina Fish farm
 Casa Romana (Bætulo)
 Decumanuses and cardo of Complutum
 Domeses Asturica Augusta
 Domuses of Clunia Sulpicia
 Fontes Tamarici, fountain in Velilla del Río Carrión
 House of the amphitheater (Emerita Augusta)
 House of the Mithraeum (Emerita Augusta)
 House of Mosaics (Lucus Augusti)
 House of the Faucets and macellum (Complutum)
 House of Hippolytus (Complutum)
 House of la Exedra (Italica)
 House of Neptune (Italica)
 House of the Patio Rodio (Italica)
 House of Hilas (Italica)
 House of the Birds (Italica)
 House of the Planetary (Italica)
 Los Columbarios
 Imperial cult enclosure (Tarraco)
 Roman hydraulic infrastructure in Toledo
 Macellum of Clunia Sulpicia
 Mansio, inn and domuses of Miacum
 Miliariums in the Vía de la Plata
 Miliariums in the Via Nova
 Militarum Columna di Lorca
 Miliarium of Cercedilla
 Roman necropolises of León
 Necropolis of Barcino
 Necropolis of Pintia 
 Necropolis of San Roque
 Roman salting factory of Cimadevilla
 S’Argamassa Roman Fish Farm
 Sewer of Asturica Augusta
 Sewer of Clunia Sulpicia
 Molacillos-Termas Romanas 
 Ovens of the Fornaca
 Porta Principalis Sinistra (Legio)
 Puerta de San Vicente and Puerta de Gonzalo Dávila (Ávila)
 Pretorio and Principia of Legio

Villas 
 Roman villa Adro Vello  
 Roman villaL'Alcora 
 Roman villa Sant Amanç 
 Villa dels Munts
 Villa del Paturro
 Villa del Val
 Roman Villa Espelt 
 Roman Villa Fortunatus 
 Villa of Aeso
 Villa of Almenara-Puras
 Villa of Bruñel
 Villa of Cambre
 Villa of Camesa-Rebolledo
 Villa of Camino de Albalate
 Villa of Can Llauder
 Cambrils 
 Villa of Can Terrers  
 Roman villa Can Sent 
 Roman villa Carrova, Amposta 
 Roman villa Casa Ferrer 
 Roman villa Cerro del Campo, Monroy 
 Villa of El Ruedo
 Roman villa Fuente Álamo 
 Villa of Gabia la Grande
 Villa of la Estación
 Villa of La Olmeda
 Villa of Las Calaveras
 Roman villa La Torrecilla, Perales del Río, Getafe 
 Villa of La Quintilla
 Villa of Las Gabias
 Villa of Las Torres 
 Villa of Los Villares
 Roman villa of Los Quintanares Sant Amanç
 Villa of Noheda
 Villa of Nova Augusta
 Roman villa Pla de Nadal 
 Roman villa of Puente Genil 
 Roman villa of Paturro 
 Villa of Río Grande
 Villa of Río Verde
 Villa of Rincón de la Victoria
 Roman villa San Pedro del Arroyo 
 Villa of Saelices el Chico 
 Roman villa San Julian de Valmuza 
 Villa of Tejada
 Roman villa Torreblanca del Sol, Fuengirola  
 Villa of Torreáguila
 Villa of Vivarium
 Roman villa Villamargo 
 El Camp de les Lloses
 Ègara
 Empúries
 Deóbriga
 Dertosa
 Archeological Park of Carranque
 Iberian-Roman town of El Monastil
 Iluro
 La Torre (Sax)
 Vareia
 Late-Roman villa of Camarzana de Tera

See also
Roman Villas in Spain and Portugal ( KMZ File)

Camps and forts 
 Atxa, Vitoria 
 Aquis Querquennis 
 Castra Cecilia 
 Castra Legionis (Legio)
 Castra Servilia 
 Ciadella - Campamento Romano As Cruces (Bajo Cubierta) 
 Los Casarejos, San Martín de Losa Ciadella - Campamento Romano As Cruces (Bajo Cubierta)
 Los Castillejos, Hermandad de Campoo de Suso Camp 
 El Cantón, Molledo y Arenas de Iguña Camp 
 Petavonium
 Robadorio, Vega de Liébana - Boca de Huérgano Camp 
 Puig-Rom, Roses Fort

Roads and road stations 
 Ab Asturica Burdigalam
 Municipia Elda ( Station)  
 Road of la Fuenfría
 Road of Toletum
 Road of Vesaya Valley
 Via Augusta
 Vía de la Plata
 Via Nova

See also
 Vias Romanas en Castilla y Leon Roman Roads in Castilla and Leon

Ports 
 River port of Caesar Augusta

See also

Ancient Ports – Ports Antiques Spain and Portugal

Cities 
 Acinipo (Ronda)
 Andelos 
 Antequera
 Arcobriga 
 Astroga 
 Ategua 
 Aratispi 
 Augustobriga 
 Arva 
 Bætulo (Badalona)
 Baelo Claudia
 Barcino (Barcelona)
 Bilbilis (Augusta Bilbilis)
 Cáparra
 Carteia/Calpe/Karpessos 
 Cara/Carta 
 Carthago Nova (Cartagena)
 Caesar Augusta (Zaragoza)
 Caesarobriga (Talavera de la Reina)
 Cerro Cepero, Baza  
 Caminreal La Caridad, Caminreal
 Castillo de Loarre Calagurris (Fibularia)
 Castulo/Caesarii Iuvenales
 Celsa 
 Ciudad portuaria fenicia La Fonteta 
 Clunia Sulpicia 
 Colonia Victrix Iulia Lépida Celsa
 Contrebia Belaisca Contrebia Belaisca/Contrebia 
 Contributa Iulia Ugultunia 
 Complutum (Alcalá de Henares)
 Corduba (Córdoba)
 Emerita Augusta (Mérida)
 Emporion (Empúries)
 Ercávica 
 Gades (Cádiz)
 Ilici/Helike/Ecclesia Elotana 
 Ilarteda 
 Ilugo
 Iptuci/Ituci 
 Italica (Santiponce)
 Labitulosa/Labitolosa 
 Lancia/Lance 
 Legio (León)
 Iessos/Iesos 
 Libisosa/Colonia Forum Augustum 
 Lucentum (Alicante) 
 Lucus Augusti (Lugo)
 Juliobriga
 Malaca (Málaga)
 Mellaria 
 Metellinum (Medelin) 
 Miacum
 Munigua 
  (Cáceres)
 Nertobriga (Tarraconense) 
 Numantia
 Ocuri 
 Onuba Aestuaria (Huelva)
 Torre de los Herberos, Dos Hermanas 
 Recópolis  
 Rhoda/Roda 
 Regina
 Sagunto
 Salaria 
 Sanisera (Menorca)
 Segóbriga 
 Sexi/Saxetanum
 Sisapo 
 Tarraco (Tarragona)
 Tiermes
 Toletum (Toledo)
 Tugia 
 Urso
 Uxama 
 Valeria 
 Vareia 
 Valentia Edetanorum

Archaeological sites in Spain
 
Roman towns and cities in Spain
 
Roman
Roman sites